The 2012 Bassetlaw District Council election took place on 3 May 2012 to elect members of Bassetlaw District Council in Nottinghamshire, England as part of the 2012 United Kingdom local elections. One third of the council was up for election. After the election, the composition of the council was:
Labour 34
Conservative 11
Independents 3

Election result

Ward results

Beckingham

Carlton

Clayworth

East Retford East

East Retford North

East Retford South

East Retford West

Harworth

Sutton

Tuxford and Trent

Worksop East

Worksop North

Worksop North-East

Worksop North-West

Worksop South

Worksop South East

2012
2012 English local elections
2010s in Nottinghamshire